San Sang Tsuen is a village in Ha Tsuen, Yuen Long District, Hong Kong.

Administration
San Sang Tsuen is a recognized village under the New Territories Small House Policy.

References

External links

 Delineation of area of existing village San Sang Tsuen (Ha Tsuen) for election of resident representative (2019 to 2022)

Villages in Yuen Long District, Hong Kong
Ha Tsuen